Robert Voigt (19 May 1913 – 25 November 1988) was a Danish wrestler. He competed in the men's Greco-Roman bantamweight at the 1936 Summer Olympics. He was eliminated after the fourth of six rounds.

References

1913 births
1988 deaths
Danish male sport wrestlers
Olympic wrestlers of Denmark
Wrestlers at the 1936 Summer Olympics
Sportspeople from Copenhagen